John Henry Dungworth (born 30 March 1955) is an English former professional footballer and coach.

Career
Born in Rotherham, then in the West Riding of Yorkshire, England, Dungworth began his playing career at Huddersfield Town, where he signed schoolboy forms in 1969, and scored on his first-team début against Middlesbrough in 1972. He was then transferred to Oldham Athletic in 1975 followed by a successful spell at Aldershot, where he scored 66 goals in 118 games. In 1977–78 he scored 23 goals in 45 league games and was voted Supporters Player of the Year. The following season he was ever present, scoring 26 times to break the all time Shots record for league goals in a season. However some of his best performances in 1978–79 were in the FA Cup where Aldershot lost in a 5th Round Replay, with Dungworth scoring 8 times in the club's cup run to make him the second highest scorer in the country with 34 goals. He won the Golden Boot Award for being the leading marksman in the Fourth Division. He joined Shrewsbury Town in October 1979, a Football League Tribunal setting the fee at £100,000, a club record fee for Aldershot. At Shrewsbury, he struggled to repeat his past scoring records. Later he moved into the back four and ended his career as a centre-half at his home town club Rotherham United.

Since he ended his playing career, he has been a coach at Sheffield United and manager of Leeds United's academy. Subsequently, he rejoined Huddersfield Town, initially as reserve team coach, and then being appointed First Team Coach in December 2006, when Terry Yorath resigned due to ill health. He left on 3 April 2008, announced as by 'mutual consent', following the departure of manager Andy Ritchie two days earlier. He joined Sheffield Wednesday in early 2009 with primary responsibility for coaching the reserve team, but departed in December 2009 along with manager Brian Laws.

References

1955 births
Living people
Footballers from Rotherham
Association football forwards
English footballers
English Football League players
Huddersfield Town A.F.C. players
Barnsley F.C. players
Oldham Athletic A.F.C. players
Rochdale A.F.C. players
Aldershot F.C. players
Shrewsbury Town F.C. players
Hereford United F.C. players
Mansfield Town F.C. players
Rotherham United F.C. players
Huddersfield Town A.F.C. non-playing staff
Sheffield United F.C. non-playing staff